Alan Cripps Nind Hopkins (27 October 1926 – 12 November 2012) was a British Conservative and National Liberal politician. He was educated at Winchester College, King's College, Cambridge and Yale University Law School. He then became a barrister at the Inner Temple.

At the 1959 general election, he was elected as the Member of Parliament (MP) for Bristol North East, defeating the Labour Co-operative MP William Coldrick. Hopkins was re-elected in 1964, but at the 1966 general election he was beaten by the Labour Party candidate Raymond Dobson. He then followed a managerial career in the engineering industry. He was twice married and had three sons.

References

1926 births
2012 deaths
Conservative Party (UK) MPs for English constituencies
National Liberal Party (UK, 1931) politicians
UK MPs 1959–1964
UK MPs 1964–1966
People educated at Winchester College